Tanveer Ahmed (born 18 September 1997) is a Hong Kong cricketer. He made his Twenty20 International debut against Afghanistan in the 2016 Asia Cup Qualifier on 22 February 2016. Before making his international debut, he was named in Hong Kong's squad for the 2016 ICC World Twenty20 tournament. He made his first-class cricket debut against Ireland in the 2015–17 ICC Intercontinental Cup on 30 August 2016. He made his One Day International (ODI) debut against Scotland on 8 September 2016.

In September 2018, he was named in Hong Kong's squad for the 2018 Asia Cup. In December 2018, he was named in Hong Kong's team for the 2018 ACC Emerging Teams Asia Cup. In April 2019, he was named in Hong Kong's squad for the 2019 ICC World Cricket League Division Two tournament in Namibia.

In September 2019, he was named in Hong Kong's squad for the 2019 ICC T20 World Cup Qualifier tournament in the United Arab Emirates. However, ahead of the 2019–20 Oman Pentangular Series, Ahmed and his brother Ehsan Nawaz, both withdrew themselves for selection for Hong Kong.

References

External links
 

1997 births
Living people
Hong Kong cricketers
Hong Kong One Day International cricketers
Hong Kong Twenty20 International cricketers
Pakistani emigrants to Hong Kong
Sportspeople of Pakistani descent